The 2010 American Handball Championship, also called PanAmericano 2010, was the 14th official competition for senior men's national handball teams of North, Center, Caribbean and South America. It was held from 22 to 26 June 2010 in Santiago, Chile. It was also acting as the qualifying competition for the 2011 World Men's Handball Championship, securing three vacancies for the World Championship. Brazil, Argentina and Chile got the Tickets for finishing at the first three places.

Participating teams

Preliminary round
All times are local (UTC−3).

Group A

Group B

Placement matches

5th–8th place semifinals

Seventh place game

Fifth place game

Final round

Semifinals

A Bomb threat stopped the semifinal of the Pan American Tournament. An anonymous phone call announced an imminent bomb explosion in the Centro de Entrenamiento Olimpico in Santiago de Chile forced the officials to stop the semifinal match of the Pan American Tournament, Argentina – Cuba. In that moment, Argentina was leading Cuba 17–8.

Third place game

Final

Final ranking

All-star team

External links
Panamhandball.org
Results at todor66.com

2010
2010 in handball
2010 in Chilean sport
International handball competitions hosted by Chile
June 2010 sports events in South America